Russian studies is an interdisciplinary field crossing politics, history, culture, economics, and languages of Russia and its neighborhood, often grouped under Soviet and Communist studies. Russian studies should not be confused with the study of the Russian literature or linguistics, which is often a distinct department within universities.

In university, a Russian studies major includes many cultural classes teaching Russian politics, history, geography, linguistics, Russian language, literature, and arts. Mysticism and folklore are commonly studied, the introduction of Christianity, rule under the tsars and expansion of Russian empire, later rule under communism, history of the Soviet Union, and its collapse and studies about present-day Russia.

Russian studies rose in prominence during the Cold War, but experienced a decline after the collapse of the Soviet Union. Aggressive behavior by Russia, particularly its invasion of Ukraine, led to increased attention to Russian studies.

See also

 Area studies
 Kremlinology
 List of Russian studies centers
 Russian culture
 Slavic studies
 Byzantine studies

References

External links
 Russian Studies at Petrozavodsk State University
 Russian Studies / University of Helsinki
 
 

 
Russian culture
Russian language
Area studies